Grodno District or Hrodna District is a district (raion) of Grodno Region of Belarus.

The administrative center is Grodno, which, however, does not form part of the district.

Notable residents 
 Andżelika Borys (born 1973), Polish activist in Belarus
 Tadevuš Kandrusievič (born 1946, Adelsk), Belarusian prelate of the Catholic Church who served as Archbishop of Minsk–Mohilev from 2007 to 2021
 Makar Kraŭcoŭ (1891-1939), participant in the Belarusian independence movement, writer and a victim of Stalin's purges who authored the lyrics of "Vajacki marš" (a popular patriotic song)

References 

 
Districts of Grodno Region